Benromach distillery is a Speyside distillery founded by Duncan McCallum and F.W. Brickman in 1898 and currently owned and run by Gordon and Macphail of Elgin. It is situated near Forres in Morayshire and is fed with spring water from the Chapelton Springs in the Romach Hills beside Forres.

History
Duncan MacCallum and F.W. Brickmann founded the Benromach Distillery Company in 1898. Duncan MacCallum had previously been working at the Glen Nevis Distillery in Campbeltown and FW Brickmann was a spirit broker in Leith, Edinburgh. Construction work started at the site of Benromach Distillery in 1898 however due to the depression in the Scotch Whisky industry in 1898 the distillery did not start producing whisky until 1900 but closed the same year due to a lack of money.

In 1911 Benromach was acquired by the London based Harvey McNair & Co who continued distilling until the onset of the First World War. After the war Benromach was acquired by Benromach Distillery Ltd and was run by this new private company until 1925. In 1938 Benromach was acquired by Associated Scottish Distilleries Ltd which later became a part of Scottish Malt Distillers Ltd. Between 1966 and 1974 the distillery was modernised and continued to run until 1983 when the distillery was officially closed.

In 1993 Gordon and MacPhail took over the site and in 1997 they started to restore the distillery to a working order. The design of the distillery was changed slightly to allow it to be operated by one man. Finally in 1998 the distillery was officially reopened by Charles, Prince of Wales and bottling of the new malt started in 2004.

At the World Whisky Awards 2014, Benromach 10 Years Old won gold in the "Best Speyside Single Malt – 12 Years and Under" category.

Scotland's Malt Whisky Trail is a tourism initiative featuring seven working Speyside distilleries including Benromach, a historic distillery (Dallas Dhu, now a museum) and the Speyside Cooperage.  According to a BBC article, visitors can try some of the whiskeys and "see the traditional dunnage warehouse (where the whiskys are stored to mature), the mash tun, the burnished copper stills — and the cask signed by Prince Charles".

Production information
Mash tuns: 1, Stainless steel mash tun capable of holding 1.5 tonnes of mash
Wash backs: 13, 11,000 litre larch wash backs
Wash stills: 1, 7,500 litre charged steam heated wash still
Spirit stills: 1, 5,000 litre charged steam heated spirit still

Benromach's annual output is around 400,000 litres of cask strength whisky.

Products

Current products 
Benromach 5 Years Old Single Malt Scotch Whisky (40% ABV)
Benromach 10 Years Old Single Malt Scotch Whisky (43% ABV)
Benromach Peat Smoke (46% ABV)
Benromach Organic Special Edition, A certified organic single malt Scotch whisky (46% ABV)
Benromach Origins Batch 1 - Golden Promise (50% ABV)
Benromach Origins Batch 2 - Port Pipes (50% ABV)
Benromach Origins Batch 3 - Optic (50% ABV)
Benromach 15 Years Old (43% ABV)
Benromach 21 Year Old (43% ABV)
Benromach 25 Year Old (43% ABV)
Benromach Cask Strength 1980 (54.2% ABV)
Benromach Vintage  1968 (43% ABV)
Benromach Classic 55 Year Old (42.4% ABV)

Past products 
Benromach Tokaji Wood Finish
Benromach Sassicaia Wood Finish (45% ABV)
Benromach Port Wood Finish 22 Year Old (45% ABV)

See also
 Whisky
 Scotch whisky
 List of whisky brands
 List of distilleries in Scotland

References

External links
Benromach Distillery Official Website
Gordon and Macphail Official Website
Benromach Distillery page on Scotchwhisky.net
Benromach Distillery on Whiksy.com

Distilleries in Scotland
Scottish malt whisky
British companies established in 1898
Food and drink companies established in 1898
1898 establishments in Scotland